The South Siberian forest steppe ecoregion (WWF ID: PA0817) is a patchwork of grasslands and forests in the low-lying areas of south central Siberia. The region is one of high biodiversity as a transition zone between the West Siberian taiga to the north, and the Altai mountains to the south. There are also small patches to the east in Irkutsk Oblast. The ecoregion is in the temperate grasslands, savannas, and shrublands biome, and the Palearctic realm, with a Humid Continental climate.

Location and description 
On the western edge there is a north-south extension that follows the Tom River in the Kuznetsk Basin. In the middle is another extension, covering a low area along the Yenisei River and some of its tributaries; this area is known as the Minusinsk Hollow. To the west is the West Siberian broadleaf and mixed forests ecoregion, which is now mostly cultivated agricultural land.

Climate 
The climate of the South Siberian forest steppe is Subarctic climate, without dry season (Köppen climate classification Subarctic climate (Dfc)). This climate is characterized by mild summers (only 1–3 months above ) and cold, snowy winters (coldest month below ). There is sufficient precipitation (averaging 200–400 mm/year) to support patchy forests.

Flora and fauna 
The region exhibits the typical forest steppe mix of grasslands and forest too sparse to create a full canopy.  Typical trees are birch, aspen and willow, generally found along the streams and in low areas.  Swamps are common.  The region was about 15% forested; this has been reduced by human activity.  The most common grass is Calamagrostis epigejos (bushgrass).

Protections 
There are no federally protected areas in the South Siberian forest steppe ecoregion.

See also 
 List of ecoregions in Russia

References 

Ecoregions of Russia
Ecoregions of Asia
Palearctic ecoregions
Temperate grasslands, savannas, and shrublands